Tyler Rowland (born 16 October 1999) is a Canadian rugby union player, currently playing for the Toronto Arrows of Major League Rugby (MLR) and the Canadian national team. His preferred position is prop.

Professional career
Rowland signed for Major League Rugby side Toronto Arrows for the 2021 Major League Rugby season, having also played for the side in 2020. Rowland made his debut for Canada in the 2021 July rugby union tests.

References

External links
itsrugby.co.uk Profile

1999 births
Living people
Canadian rugby union players
Canada international rugby union players
Rugby union props
Toronto Arrows players